Podar Education Network is a network of schools in India, managed by the Anandilal Podar Trust of Mumbai. The trust was established in 1927 by a Mumbai-based businessman Sheth Anandilal Podar. , the group had 116 schools across India. It was awarded the status of International Baccalaureate World School in 2005, and in 2011 was CIS (Council of International Schools) certified.

Locations 
The schools are located in following cities of India.

Bihar 
 Gaya
 Samastipur
 Muzaffarpur

Chhattisgarh 
 Raipur

Gujarat 
 5 Podar World School
 20 Podar International School
 List of Podar World School in Gujarat: 

 List of Podar International School in Gujarat :

Karnataka 
 Belgaum
 Bengaluru, Chikka Kodigehalli
 Bengaluru, Off Bannerghatta Road
 Bengaluru.Horamavu Kalkere
 Davangere
 Hassan
 Mysore 
 Shimoga 
 Tumkur
 Udupi

Madhya Pradesh 
 Chhindwara
 Gwalior 
 Indore
 Indore  2
 Khandwa
 Ratlam
 Ujjain
 Bhopal

Maharashtra 
 Ahmednagar
 Akola
 Ambegaon
 Amravati
 Aurangabad, Shahnoorwadi
 Aurangabad, Garkhedha
 Baramati 
 Beed 
 Bhandara
 Bhusawal
 Chakan 
 Chalisgaon 
 Chinchwad
 Chandrapur
 Dhule
 Gondia
 Hingoli
 Jalgaon
 Jalna 
 Kalyan
 Karad
 Kolhapur
 Latur
 Nagpur, Besa
 Nagpur, Katol 
 Nagpur, Koradi 
 Nanded
 Nandurbar
 Nashik
 Nerul, Palm Beach Road, Navi 
 Wardha
Mumbai
 Nerul, Seawoods, Navi Mumbai
 Osmanabad
 Parbhani
 Pimpri 
 Santacruz, Linking Road, Mumbai
 Santacruz, Saraswati Road, Mumbai
 Santacruz, Jain Derasar Marg, Mumbai
 Podar World College, Santacruz, Juhu Tara Road, Mumbai
 Powai, Mumbai
 Sangli 
 Satara 
 Shirur
 Solapur 
 Thane
 Wagholi
 Worli 
 Yavatmal
Daund

Punjab 
 Patiala
 Ludhiana

See also 
 Podar World School
 Podar International School

References

External links
Podar International School on CIS website
Podar International School on IBO site
Podar International School website

Private schools in Karnataka
1927 establishments in India
Educational institutions established in 1927
High schools and secondary schools in Karnataka
Private schools in Punjab, India
Private schools in Maharashtra
Private schools in Madhya Pradesh
Private schools in Gujarat
Private schools in Chhattisgarh
Private schools in Bihar